Kristine Sommer (born October 2, 1990) is an American rugby union player. She was named in the Eagles 2017 Women's Rugby World Cup squad.

Sommer graduated with a degree in chemistry from the University of California, Santa Barbara. She plays for the Seattle Saracens. She made her sevens debut for the US sevens team in 2016.

Sommer was named in the Eagles squad for the 2022 Pacific Four Series in New Zealand. She was selected in the Eagles squad for the 2021 Rugby World Cup in New Zealand.

References

External links
 Kristine Sommer at USA Rugby

1990 births
Living people
American female rugby union players
United States women's international rugby union players
University of California, Santa Barbara alumni
21st-century American women